Ballinea or Ballina, is a village and townland in County Westmeath, Ireland. It is located to the west of Mullingar, on the R390 road. The Royal Canal flows through the village, with the Ballinea Bridge being used to cross to the western side.

Amenities 
The nearest primary school is St Kenny National School which is 1.4 km away.

The Royal Canal Way and Athlone to Mullingar Cycleway are accessible via Ballinea Bridge. There is also a children's playground near the bridge.

See also 

 List of towns and villages in Ireland

References

External links
 

Towns and villages in County Westmeath